Anca Popescu  (born ) is a retired Romanian female volleyball player, who played as a middle blocker.

She was part of the Romania women's national volleyball team at the 2002 FIVB Volleyball Women's World Championship in Germany. On club level she played with TV Fischbek.

Clubs
 TV Fischbek (2002)

References

1976 births
Living people
Romanian women's volleyball players
Place of birth missing (living people)